Epicrocis vansoni is a species of snout moth in the genus Epicrocis. It was described by Boris Balinsky in 1994 and is found in South Africa.

References

Moths described in 1994
Phycitini
Endemic moths of South Africa